LBLR may refer to:

Lea Bailey Light Railway
Leighton Buzzard Light Railway